Bukan (electoral district) is the 6th electoral district in the West Azerbaijan Province of Iran. It has a population of 224,628 and elects 1 member of parliament.

1980
MP in 1980 from the electorate of Bukan. (1st)
 Mohammad Shaverani

1984
MP in 1984 from the electorate of Bukan. (2nd)
 Mohammad Shaverani

1988
MP in 1988 from the electorate of Bukan. (3rd)
 Ahmad Taha

1992
MP in 1992 from the electorate of Bukan. (4th)
 Ahmad Taha

1996
MP in 1996 from the electorate of Bukan. (5th)
 Anvar Habibzadeh

2000
MP in 2000 from the electorate of Bukan. (6th)
 Rahman Namju

2004
MP in 2004 from the electorate of Bukan. (7th)
 Anvar Habibzadeh

2008
MP in 2008 from the electorate of Bukan. (8th)
 Mohammad Qasim Osmani

2012
MP in 2012 from the electorate of Bukan. (9th)
 Mohammad Qasim Osmani

2016

Notes

References

Electoral districts of West Azerbaijan
Bukan County
Deputies of Bukan